Burris House may refer to:

Burris House and Potawatomi Spring, Carroll County, Indiana, listed on the National Register of Historic Places (NRHP) 
Charles McLaran House, also known as Burris House, Columbus, Mississippi, NRHP-listed
Bost-Burris House, also known as the Elias Burris House, near Newton, Catawba County, North Carolina, NRHP-listed

See also
McIntyre-Burri House in St. Joseph, Missouri, NRHP-listed